The Bosstones (also known as The Boss-Tones) were an American musical group who performed in the instrumentally-sparse, a cappella-based harmonic style known as Philadelphia doo-wop.

The Bosstones apparently released only one record in their history: "Mope-Itty Mope" b/w "Wings of an Angel" in 1959 on the Boss Records label. The record was a not a national or regional hit (although it did manage to scrape into the playlists of a few stations, such as KIMN in Denver in May of that year).

"Mope-Itty Mope" would probably have fallen into complete obscurity except for fact that Mexican border blaster XEAK decided to play it in 1961 -- in fact, they played it over and over for 72 straight hours, stunting its new format: "Extra News", the first 24-hour all-news station in Southern California (and one of the first in the United States).

In 1962, The Dovells remade "Mope-itty Mope" as "The Mope-itty Mope Stomp".

In 1983, a ska punk band, calling themselves The Bosstones, was formed in Boston, Massachusetts. After finding out about the long-defunct group of the same name, the newer band changed its name to The Mighty Mighty Bosstones, at the suggestion of a bartender friend, in order to avoid any possible legal hassles.

Notes

American rhythm and blues musical groups